The 1960 Auburn Tigers football team represented Auburn University in the 1960 NCAA University Division football season. It was the Tigers' 69th overall and 27th season as a member of the Southeastern Conference (SEC). The team was led by head coach Ralph "Shug" Jordan, in his tenth year, and played their home games at Cliff Hare Stadium in Auburn and Legion Field in Birmingham, Alabama. They finished with a record of eight wins and two losses (8–2 overall, 5–2 in the SEC).

Schedule

References

Auburn
Auburn Tigers football seasons
Auburn Tigers football